The Mancunian Way is a two mile long grade separated elevated motorway in Manchester, England. It is officially made up of the A57(M) and A635(M) motorways, although the latter does not appear on road signs for practical reasons.  It is also part of two other roads: the A57 to the west, which runs east–west through Greater Manchester linking the M602 and M67 motorways, and a short section of non-motorway A635 to the east.  Part of this non-motorway section collapsed on 14 August 2015 due to a sinkhole.

Route
The road forms a major part of the ManchesterSalford Inner Ring Road and runs south of the city centre.  Running eastbound, it starts as a two-lane dual carriageway and passes underneath the A56.  Following this, the road widens to three lanes.  At the next junction which leads to the A5103, the road reduces to two lanes and becomes an elevated highway.  This section runs atop link roads and two roundabouts before reaching the next junction with the A34. At this point the road passes through the centre of the campuses of UMIST (now part of the University of Manchester) and Manchester Metropolitan University.  It then runs for around  before reaching its junction with the A6 which it crosses on a bridge before dropping down to ground level.  It then finishes on the A635 and continues eastbound, and also continues to be called the Mancunian Way.

History

Design
The Mancunian Way was conceived to form part of the South East Lancashire and North East Cheshire (SELNEC) Highway Plan of 1962, although similar proposals were developed from 1959. A parliamentary bill to authorise the construction of the Mancunian Way was proposed and approved in 1961. During its design it was known as Link Road 17/7. The scheme lies over the geological West Manchester Fault.

It would be the first elevated main road to be built outside London, and the UK's second aerial motorway after the Hammersmith flyover. The road is 3,232 ft (985 m) long and has 28 spans of 105 ft (32 m), and two spans of 60 ft (18 m).

The spans are made out of precast concrete, with hollow box-units post-tensioned to form a spine beam. Each of the 105 ft spans is made out of 14 precast concrete hollow box-units 7 ft 3in long. Freyssinet (named after Eugène Freyssinet) multi-strand prestressing cables were threaded through ducts in the box sections. Testing of the design was carried on a 1/12th model at the Research Station of the Cement and Concrete Association at Wexham Springs in South Bucks. The design was made by the consulting engineers G Maunsell & Partners, who had designed the similar Hammersmith flyover in 1961. The company was known for prestressed concrete flyovers. The design received a Concrete Society award.

The designer of the bridges would go on to design the Westway dual carriageway in London, which opened as the A40(M) in July 1970, losing its motorway status in 2000.

Construction

The construction was carried out in two phases: the first stage involved the construction of a dual carriageway of 2,850 ft (869 m) to the east of the A6 road in November 1963 and was opened to traffic as part of the A635 road in November 1965.

The second stage was the construction, from December 1964, of a 0.6 mi (1 km) long elevated highway of a motorway standard which ran between the A6 and A56 roads. The second stage was open to traffic as part of the A57 road in March 1967. The previous day it was opened to pedestrians, who were allowed to walk the whole of the high-level route as a sight-seeing publicity exercise. Many people brought picnics which they ate in the centre of the carriageway.

At that time, the construction specifications had included cosmetic fairings to the tops of the support piers. These completely enclosed the roller bearings upon which the elevated roadway sits. However, the first time these bearings were serviced, the fairings were removed and never replaced. This leaves the poorer appearance seen today and also allows the ingress of dirt to the bearings.

Leonard Fairclough & Son were the contractors, and the prestressed concrete sections were made at its operations in Adlington, Lancashire. The contractor's site compound was in Loxford Street. The piling was completed by Pigott Foundations of Ormskirk with auger (screw) boring with reinforcement cages. The piling went 50 ft (15 m) deep through the boulder clay to the Bunter sandstone (Buntsandstein). The road on the structure and kerbing was built by Wilson and Wilkinson of Worsley in Salford.

Opening
The Mancunian Way was officially opened by Prime Minister, Harold Wilson, on 5 May 1967. At the time of its opening the Manchester Evening News referred to it as the "highway in the sky". The scheme cost was £5.5million (£million in today's figures).

Extension as the A635(M)
In 1992, the westbound junction was rebuilt to replace a temporary flyover, whereby the A56 passed over a roundabout where the A57(M) originally ended. At the same time, a new flyover was built at the eastern end, over the A6, but was legally designated as the A635(M) in 1995.

Oddities
Just before the junction with the A34 is an unfinished slip road (stub) that ends 20 feet in the air, although development next to Mancuian Way has meant much of the stub was demolished in October 2018.

The last ½ mile (0.80 km) of the Mancunian Way in the east is part of the A635, the A57 heading south east from the same junction as the A6, though it states A57(M) on the signage as one enters westbound. Department for Transport documentation states differently, so officially the Mancunian Way consists of two motorways, the A57(M) and the A635(M).

Part of the easternmost non-motorway section of Mancunian Way collapsed into a 40 ft (12 m) sinkhole on 14 August 2015, after almost half a month's worth of rain fell in parts of Manchester in just six hours. The closure caused significant congestion on the remaining part of Mancunian Way and other nearby roads. It fully reopened on 15 June 2016 after 10 months of repair work.

Cultural references
The 2006 Take That album Beautiful World includes a track entitled "Mancunian Way", which is about the city of Manchester and the local vicinity and notable events. The group was formed in Manchester and three of the five original members are from the Greater Manchester area.

Junctions
Note: motorway has no junction numbers

See also
List of motorways in the United Kingdom

References

Further reading
"The Mancunian Way – Manchester's Prestressed Concrete Elevated Roadway". Concrete Quarterly (72) January–March 1967. (Detailed construction information).

External links

  Mancunian Way Manchester Archives+
 CBRD Motorway Database – A57(M)
 CBRD Videos M602 / A57(M)
 Pathetic Motorways – A57(M)
 The Motorway Archive – A57(M)

5-0057
5-0057
5-0057
Buildings and structures in Manchester
History of Manchester